The Young Communist League (UJC) is the  youth organization of the Communist Party of Cuba. Its membership is voluntary and selective, and counts more than 600,000 active members. Its symbol shows the stylized faces of Julio Antonio Mella, Camilo Cienfuegos and Che Guevara. The  motto is Estudio, Trabajo, Fusil and means "Study, Work, Rifle".

History
The Cuban Young Communist League came into existence along with the Communist Party of Cuba in 1965.

Organization
Yuniasky Crespo Baquero is the First Secretary of the organisation. The UJC is a member organization of the World Federation of Democratic Youth. The 11th and 14th World Festival of Youth and Students were hosted in Cuba by the organization. The UJC publishes the daily newspaper Juventud Rebelde (Rebellious Youth) throughout Cuba.

See also

 José Martí Pioneer Organization

References

External links
Juventud Rebelde

Youth organizations based in Cuba
Youth wings of communist parties
Youth wings of political parties in Cuba
Communist Party of Cuba
1965 establishments in Cuba
Youth organizations established in 1965